Division No. 1, Subdivision J is an unorganized subdivision on the Avalon Peninsula in Newfoundland and Labrador, Canada. It is in Division 1.

Newfoundland and Labrador subdivisions